John F. Donnellan (born 27 March 1937) is an Irish former politician and sportsman. He served as a Fine Gael Teachta Dála (TD) for twenty-five years and as a Minister of State from 1982 to 1987. He played Gaelic football for his local club Dunmore McHales and at senior level for the Galway county team in the 1960s.

Early and private life
John Donnellan was born in Dunmore, County Galway in 1937. He was born into a family that had strong interests in both Gaelic games and Irish politics. His father, Michael Donnellan, had won an All-Ireland Senior Football Championship (SFC) medal with Galway in 1925, later becoming a TD for Clann na Talmhan. John Donnellan would go on to follow in his father's footsteps in both of these pursuits, although for a different party. John's son, Michael, would also go on to play football for Galway, winning All-Ireland SFC medals in 1998 and 2001.

Playing career

Club
Donnellan played his club football with the Dunmore McHales club in the north of County Galway. He enjoyed much success with the club, beginning in 1961 when he won a senior county championship for the first time. In 1962 Donnellan won a county league medal before claiming a second county championship title in 1963. This last win was later converted into a Connacht club football championship. In 1966 Donnellan's club completed the double of county league and county championship victories. He completed a great run of success by capturing back-to-back county championship and Connacht club titles in 1968 and 1969.

Inter-county
Donnellan's career as an inter-county footballer began in the late 1950s. He won an All-Ireland Junior Football Championship title with the Galway junior team in 1958 and he quickly joined the senior side. Two years later in 1960 Donnellan won his first Connacht title; however, Galway were later defeated in the All-Ireland SFC semi-final. Three years later in 1963 he captured a second provincial title; however on that occasion Dublin defeated the men from the west in the All-Ireland SFC final. In 1964 Donnellan was appointed captain of the Galway team. That year he won a third Connacht title before leading his team out in the All-Ireland final against Kerry. Galway were victorious on that day by five points and Donnellan captured his first All-Ireland SFC medal. His moment of triumph was short-lived as, shortly after hoisting the Sam Maguire Cup, he learned that his father Michael had died in the Hogan Stand shortly before the start of the second-half.

In 1965 Donnellan added a fourth provincial medal to his collection. In the subsequent All-Ireland final against Kerry he was sent off but Galway were still victorious, giving Donnellan a second consecutive All-Ireland medal. The following year he won a fifth Connacht Championship title before qualifying for a fourth consecutive All-Ireland final appearance. Galway had a six-point win over Meath, thus giving Donnellan a third consecutive All-Ireland SFC medal and establishing that Galway team as one of the greatest of all time. In 1967 he won a Railway Cup medal with Connacht before winning a sixth and final provincial medal in 1968. Donnellan retired from inter-county football shortly after.

Political career
Donnellan's father Michael died suddenly in September 1964, and at the resulting by-election in December John was elected to Dáil Éireann as a Fine Gael TD for the Galway East constituency. He was successful at the next eight general elections, with changes of constituency; to Galway North-East in 1969, back to Galway East in 1977, and from 1981 to 1989 for Galway West.

In December 1982, he was appointed by Garret FitzGerald as Minister of State at the Department of Posts and Telegraphs and Minister of State at the Department of Transport. In 1983, he was re-assigned as Minister of State at the Department of Health and Minister of State at the Department of Social Welfare with special responsibility for public health and social welfare information. He served until Fine Gael left office after the 1987 general election. Donnellan retired from politics at the 1989 general election.

See also
Families in the Oireachtas

References

1937 births
Living people
All-Ireland-winning captains (football)
John
Dunmore McHales Gaelic footballers
Galway inter-county Gaelic footballers
Fine Gael TDs
Irish farmers
Irish sportsperson-politicians
Members of the 17th Dáil
Members of the 18th Dáil
Members of the 19th Dáil
Members of the 20th Dáil
Members of the 21st Dáil
Members of the 22nd Dáil
Members of the 23rd Dáil
Members of the 24th Dáil
Members of the 25th Dáil
Ministers of State of the 24th Dáil
Politicians from County Galway